Global Memory Net (GMNet) is a world digital library of cultural, historical, and heritage image collections. It is directed by Ching-chih Chen, Professor Emeritus of Simmons College, Boston, Massachusetts and supported by the National Science Foundation (NSF)'s International Digital Library Program (IDLP). The goal of GMNet is to provide a global collaborative network that provides universal access to educational resources to a worldwide audience. GMNet provides multilingual and multimedia content and retrieval, as well as links directly to major resources, such as OCLC, Internet Archive, Million Book Project, and Google.

History

Global Memory Net superseded Chinese Memory Net (CMNet) , which was founded in 2001 as a NSF/IDLP project. It was intended to make Chinese cultural and heritage resources globally accessible in a multimedia format. "The experiences and knowledge gained from [CMNet] made me realize the need to rethink the model for information dissemination and use," wrote Chen in 2001.  CMNet later expanded to represent global collections and officially became Global Memory Net in 2003.

Collections

Reflecting GMNet's origins in CMNet and Prof. Chen's earlier PROJECT EMPEROR-I, an interactive multimedia project  , the strongest portion of the collection's content is from China and Asia. This collection includes over 8000 images and featured videos of this World Heritage Site and the original discovery and excavation of the Emperor's terracotta army.

Additional to the Asian collections are materials from around the world. A number of comprehensive collections are included, covering specific sites, cultures, and other overarching themes from content collaborators, including the UNESCO's Memory of the World, Asia Division of Library of Congress, national libraries, academic institutions, and some private groups. These collections feature images of geographical locations and historical sites, historical manuscripts, maps, art, indigenous crafts, weapons, pottery and musical instruments. Every image is accompanied by metadata information. Images of musical instruments are linked with the audio and video files, and with notations. Metadata is recorded in multiple languages. In general, English is provided and is often also available in the local language of the object's country of origin. A recent ongoing project is the multilingual and multimedia documentation of all the UNESCO World Heritage Sites, known as World Heritage Memory Net.

Collections in GMNet are broken up into the following categories to help users browse the extensive content:
 Antique Maps
 Arts, Paintings, Poetry
 Cathedrals, Churches, Shrines, Temples
 Ethnic Groups
 Historical Cities
 Musical Instruments
 National Libraries
 National Memories
 Old Civilizations and Culture
 Palaces- Ancient and Current
 Selected Museums
 UNESCO Memory of the World
 UNESCO World Heritage Sites

In addition, GMNet also includes instant access to over 2530 digital collections from over 80 countries in the world in its World Digital Collections.

Usage

Search Methods

When one enters GMNet, all collections can be searched using an open search box, which allows traditional search by metadata fields (such as title, date, location, keyword, source, etc.) in multiple languages.  Advanced Search with additional Boolean Operators is available for both Collections and images by language and by multiple fields.

Information in GMNet is retrieved not only by the traditional way of searching by collection listings, country, or timeline, but especially by enhanced search methods including freely browsing, randomly looking for images of interest, finding similar images, zooming for details, and obtaining appropriate annotations.

GMNet's search capabilities include:

 Content-based image retrieval (CBIR): This is one of the key features of Global Memory Net.
A user can gain familiarity with an unknown collection through CBIR using Random and Browse image searches, which allow users to browse the collections without requiring knowledge of the language used to describe the records. Randomizing allows users to view a randomized overview of thumbnail images for a collection; users can then follow their visual or contextual interests and narrow their focus if they wish by using the Similar, Larger, and Info functions. Similar retrieves images of the same color and shape, and uses the CBIR developed by Prof. James Z. Wang at Penn State University, but modified in-house . Users can enlarge the thumbnail images  (magnification varies with resolution) and also obtain additional descriptive information, including multilingual, multimedia and links where available.

 Traditional Search:
When one has some knowledge of a given collection or of specific information that they are seeking within that collection, a search box allows traditional search by metadata fields (such as title, date, location, keyword, source, etc.) in multiple languages.

 Geographical Search:
Collections are also accessible through a navigation bar link to a listing by country, leading to multiple browsable images and information.

 Temporal Search:
All Collections are listed on a sliding timeline which links to individual Collection pages with information and browsable images. Users can scroll through the centuries viewing all relevant Sites Collections related to the time period of interest.

Linked Data

GMNet links to outside data sources to provide more additional information resources to the user. These resources include OCLC, Internet Archive, Million Books, Google Scholar and Google Books, Wikipedia, and Flickr.

User’s Projects

Registered users may create up to 3 projects and save images in a durable portfolio within GMNet. As users search through the collections they can save and add notes and metadata to individual objects.

Partners

GMNet's partners can be divided into two categories:

Technology partners
 Howard D.Wactlar, School of Computer Science, Carnegie Mellon University, Pittsburgh, PA, USA
 James Z.Wang, College of Information Sciences and Technology, Pennsylvania State University, University Park, PA, USA
 Jian-bo Shi, School of Computer Science, University of Pennsylvania, Philadelphia, PA, USA
 Von-Wun Soo, Chen-Yu Lee, Chao-Chun Yeh, Department of computer science, National Tsing Hua University, Taiwan
 Piero Baglioni, Rodorico Giorgi, Department of Chemistry, University of Florence, Italy
 Takashi Nagatsuka, Tsurumi University, Department of Library, Archival, and Information Studies, Yokohama, Japan

Content partners
 Global Memory Net, 2003 on - US Library of Congress, Asian Division; Hainan University, Hainan, China; Shanghai Jiao-Tong U, Shanghai; Sichuan University, Chengdu, China; Tsurumi University, Yokohoma, Japan; University J. J. Strossmayer, Osijek, Croatia; Vietnam Museum of Ethnology, Hanoi, Vietnam, etc.
 Chinese Memory Net, 2000-2002 - Peking University, Beijing; Tsinghua University, Beijing; Shanghai Jiao-Tong University, Shanghai, China; Academia Sinica, Taiwan; National Taiwan University, Taiwan.
 Piero Baglioni, Rodorico Giorgi, Department of Chemistry, University of Florence, Italy

Related projects
 World Heritage Memory Net (WHMNet) Launched on April 29, 2011, WHMnet is a model global digital library of cultural, historical, and heritage collections related to the current 911 World Heritage Sites of 151 countries inscribed by the UNESCO World Heritage Committee.
 National Tsing Hua University Memory Net  Launched on April 23, 2011, NTHU Memory Net was developed jointly by NTHU and Global Connection and Collaboration to create an online multimedia and multilingual knowledge base celebrating Tsing Hua's Centennial Anniversary.  NTHU Memory Net is based on the same conceptual framework and uses the i-M-C-S system which was developed for GMNet, and enhanced for WHMNet.

Awards
 American Library Association, “LITA names winner of 2006 Kilgour Award”,  April 18, 2006, Accessed February 20, 2009.
 Ching-chih Chen receives 2008 Beta Phi Mu Award, March 18, 2008, Accessed May 19, 2011.

References

For extensive references regarding additional publications by Dr. Ching-chih Chen, consult the detailed listing and full-text files of the sources listed in GMNet Archives.

Other Publications authored by Collaborators and Third-Parties are listed below:

 "Global Memory Net is now universally accessible through the Web,” Library Times International, 24 (1): 7 (July 2007).
 Chen, Ching-chih, “The role of art libraries and their partners in documenting and preserving the threatened cultures: The case of Global Memory Net and the World Heritage Digital Library,” IFLA Art Libraries Section Newsletter, No. 60, pp. 4–5 (2007).
 "LITA Names Winner of 2006 Kilgour Award,” Library Times International, 23 (1): 8 (July 2006).
 Badurina, Boris and Ching-chih Chen, 2006. "Osijek Treasures Are One Click Away at the Global Memory Net," In: Proceedings of the LIDA (Library In the Digital Age) Meeting, Dubrovnik, Croatia, May 31, 2006.
 Wang, James Z., Kurt Grieb, Ya Zhang, Ching-chih Chen, Yixin Chen, and Jaia Li, "Machine annotation and retrieval for digital imagery of historical materials," International Journal on Digital Libraries, 6 (1); 18-29 (February 2006).
 Borbinha, Jose, Ching-chih Chen, and Stavros Christodoulakis, "Multimedia, contents and management," International Journal on Digital Libraries, 6 (1): 1-2, February 23, 2006 (online). Editorial of the Special Issue on Multimedia, Contents and Management, edited by Borbinha, Chen and Christodoulaks.
 Zhang, Shengqiang and Ching-chih Chen, "Global Memory Net and development of digital image information management system: Experience and practice," Journal of Zhejiang University SCIENCE, 6A (11): 1216-1220. November 2005.
 Chen, Ching-chih, "Global Memory Net Offers the Word Instantly: Offers the World Instantly: Potentials for Universal Access to Invaluable Japanese Contents," Translated by Prof. T. Nagatsuka, Journal of Information Processing and Management, 47 (11): 751-760. February 2005.
 Nagatsuka, Takashi and Ching-chih Chen, 2005. "Global Memory Net offers new innovative access to Tsurumi's old Japanese Waka poems and tales, and maps," Digital Libraries: Implementing Strategies and Sharing Experiences [Proceedings of the 7th International Conference on Asian Digital Libraries (ICADL 2005), Bangkok, Thailand, December 12–15, 2005]. Berlin, Germany: Springer-Verlag. pp. 149–157.
 Thatcher, Victoria, "The Global Memory Network- Where Art and Artifacts Meet 21st Century Technology," Information Link (Simmons College), 9 (8): 1, 3 (October 2005).
 Baglioni, Piero, Rodorico Giorgi, and Ching-chih Chen. 2003. "Nanoparticle technology saves cultural relics: potential for a multimedia digital library," In: Online Proceedings of DELOS/NSF Workshop on Multimedia Contents in Digital Libraries, Crete, Greece, June 2–3, 2003.
 Cheng, Gordon. "Chinese Memory Net and China-US Million Book Digital Library Project" PLUS Bulletin pp. 34–36 (March 2003).
 Antonuccio, Irene "Collaborzione tra la Fondazione Bonino-Pulejo e la National Science Foundation: Arte e cultura su Internet: La professoressa Chen ha illustrato il progetto: Global Memory Net," Gazzetta del Sud, Messina, Italy, December 20, 2003 p. 16.  "Global Memory Net," was presented at Fondazione Bonino-Pulejo in Messina, Italy, December 18, 2003, and followed by local TV interview.
 "Message from the Chair: Asia, Africa, and the Middle East," AAMES Newsletter: A biannual publication of the Asian, African, and Middle Eastern Section of ACRL/ALA 1 (1): 1-3 (November 2003).
 Wang, James Z., Jia Li and Ching-chih Chen. 2003. "Machine annotation for digital imagery of historical materials using the ALIP system," In: Online Proceedings of DELOS/NSF Workshop on Multimedia Contents in Digital Libraries, Crete, Greece, June 2–3, 2003. PDF Version
 Soo, Von-Wun, C. Y. Lee, C. C. Lin, S. L. Chen and Ching-chih Chen. 2003. "Automated semantic annotation and retrieval based on sharable ontology and case-based learning techniques," In: Proceedings of the ACM/IEEE Joint Conference on Digital Libraries, Houston, TX, May 29, 2003. PDF Version
 Wang, James Z., Jia Li and Ching-chih Chen. 2002. "Interdisciplinary research to advance digital imagery indexing and retrieval technologies for Asian art and cultural heritages," In: Proceedings of ACM Multimedia (Workshop on Multimedia Information Retrieval), Juan Les Pins, France, December 2002. 6 p.
 Wactlar, Howard D. and Ching-chih Chen. 2002. "Enhanced perspectives for historical and cultural documentaries using Informedia technologies," In: Proceedings of the ACM/IEEE Joint Conference on Digital Libraries (JCDL), Portland, OR, July 15–18, 2002. pp. 338–339. PDF Version
 Soo, Von-Wun, Chen-yu Lee, Chao-Chun Yeh and Ching-chih Chen. 2002. "Using sharable ontology to retrieve historical images," In: Proceedings of the ACM/IEEE Joint Conference on Digital Libraries (JCDL), Portland, OR, July 15–18, 2002. pp. 197–198. PDF Version

Aggregation-based digital libraries
American digital libraries